The Minister for the Environment is a minister within the Cabinet of Victoria tasked with the responsibility of overseeing the Victorian Government's laws and initiatives on environment.

Ingrid Stitt has been the minister since December 2022.

Ministers

See also 
 Minister for the Environment and Water (Australia)
 Minister for Environment (Western Australia)
 Minister for Environment and Natural Resources (Northern Territory)
 Minister for Environment and Heritage

Reference list 

Victoria State Government
Ministers of the Victoria (Australia) state government
!